The Homestead is a historic home located at Waccabuc, Westchester County, New York. It has five contributing buildings and one contributing structure.  The main house, known as The Homestead, was built between 1820 and 1822 in the Federal style by the locally prominent Mead family.  It has a four bay wide main block with a three bay ell. The frame building sits on a cut stone foundation. Also on the property is a 19th-century barn, four room cottage, tool shed (c. 1900), chicken house (c. 1900), and well house.  The Mead family built the separately listed Mead Memorial Chapel.

It was added to the National Register of Historic Places in 2001.

See also
National Register of Historic Places listings in northern Westchester County, New York

References

Houses on the National Register of Historic Places in New York (state)
Federal architecture in New York (state)
Houses completed in 1822
Houses in Westchester County, New York
National Register of Historic Places in Westchester County, New York
1822 establishments in New York (state)